Sherwin Glass (1927?–2005?) founded Farmer's Furniture Company,  He was elected to the Furniture Hall of Fame and engaged in huge philanthropy including providing the Sherwin Glass Swim Center at the Atlanta Jewish Community Center and endowing the Shana Glass Leadership Conference for the Anti-Defamation League.      He also received major awards from the Anti-Defamation League and the Jewish Federation.  He had seven brothers and sisters all of which predeceased him except Sarah L. Bush of Boca Raton, FL.

References

Sources 
http://www.thebeverlyhillscourier.com/05142004/MN10.htm
SLAKMAN v. CONTINENTAL CASUALTY COMPANY
The Northside Hospital Family Aquatic Center Sherwin Glass Aquatic Center
Sherwin Glass - legacy of a great Georgia citizen
http://www.legis.state.ga.us/legis/2005_06/fulltext/sr1029.htm

20th-century American Jews
1920s births
2005 deaths
20th-century American businesspeople
21st-century American Jews